Abraham van der Hoef (1611 – 1666), was a Dutch Golden Age painter.

Biography
He was born in Haarlem and is known for landscapes with battle scenes. He worked in Delft and became a member of the guild there in 1651. He may have been related to the beer brewer Abraham van Hoeven of Delft, the son of Asper Fransz van der Hoeve or Houve, also known as Apert Fransen, who according to Karel van Mander had been a pupil of Frans Floris.
He died in Haarlem.

References

 
Abraham van der Hoef on Artnet

External links
 

1611 births
1666 deaths
Dutch Golden Age painters
Dutch male painters
Artists from Haarlem
Painters from Delft